Fahrudin is a Bosnian masculine given name. Notable people with the name include: 
 Fahrudin Aličković (born 1979), Serbian retired footballer
 Fahrudin Durak (born 1966), Yugoslav retired football player
 Fahrudin Gjurgjevikj (born 1992), Bosnian wrestler
 Fahrudin Hodžić (born 1963), Bosnian football player
 Fahrudin Jusufi (1939–2019), Yugoslav footballer
 Fahrudin Kuduzović (born 1984), Bosnian-British retired footballer 
 Fahrudin Melić (born 1984), Montenegrin handballer
 Fahrudin Mustafić (born 1981), Singaporean footballer
 Fahrudin Omerović (born 1961), Bosnian former footballer 
 Fahrudin Pecikoza (born 1962), Bosnian songwriter
 Fahrudin Prljača (born 1944), Bosnian-Herzegovinian and Yugoslav retired footballer 
 Fahrudin Radončić (born 1957), Bosnian media magnate, entrepreneur, investor, and politician
 Fahrudin Šolbić (born 1958), Bosnian professional football manager

Bosnian masculine given names